Am I Normal? is a programme which is broadcast on Radio Four, presented by Vivienne Parry.

History
It enjoyed a brief airing on BBC television, when it was presented by Tanya Byron, but is more commonly presented on Radio Four. It deals with issues surrounding how far measures of characteristics, both psychological and physical, can be defined as "normal". Earlier series included programmes that looked at  obsessive compulsive disorder, and the most recent series, as of July 2011, has looked at sexuality and immunology. The programme on immunology included review of recent research on ageing and immunology, and asked whether farmers may be more immune to certain diseases because their immune systems have had a greater chance to develop than those of the bulk of the population.

The programme began its eighth series in July 2011. In the seventh series, broadcast in 2010, the programme looked at ageing, health anxiety and eating behaviour.

The programme began being broadcast in November 2006, when it looked at psychosis.

References

BBC Radio 4 programmes
2006 radio programme debuts
Radio programs adapted into television shows